The Southern Star is a weekly regional newspaper based in Skibbereen, County Cork in Ireland and was established in 1889 as the Cork County Southern Star, by brothers Florence and John O'Sullivan. 

One of its rival newspapers in the 19th century was The Skibbereen Eagle, founded in 1857. It had become "famous by declaring it was 'keeping an eye on the Czar of Russia' over his expansionist designs on China". On the centenary of the event, Brendan McWilliams gave a slightly different account in The Irish Times, saying that on 5 September 1898 The Skibbereen Eagle'''s editorial stated "We will still keep our eye on the Emperor of Russia and on all such despotic enemies, whether at home or abroad, of human progression and man's natural rights.".The Skibbereen Eagle eventually folded and, in 1929, was bought out by The Southern Star.

One of the early editors of The Southern Star was D. D. Sheehan, and the paper included amongst its shareholders General Michael Collins.

Currently The Southern Star'' is the largest selling newspaper in Cork county, employing about 30 people and has a weekly readership of over 50,000. It is privately owned by the O'Regan family, who reside in Skibbereen. Liam O'Regan edited the paper 1958 until his death in January 2009.

References

Further reading
Alan McCarthy, Newspapers and Journalism in Cork, 1910-23: Press, Politics and Revolution, Four Courts Press, 2020

External links

The Southern Star Facebook page
The Southern Star Twitter account

1889 establishments in Ireland
Mass media in County Cork
Newspapers published in the Republic of Ireland
Newspapers established in 1889
Skibbereen
Weekly newspapers published in Ireland